A corynebacteriophage (or just corynephage) is a DNA-containing bacteriophage specific for bacteria of genus Corynebacterium as its host.

Corynebacterium diphtheriae virus strain Corynebacterium diphtheriae phage (aka Corynephage β or just β-phage) introduces toxigenicity into strains of Corynebacterium diphtheriae as it encodes diphtheria toxin,
it has subtypes beta c and beta vir.

According to proposed taxonomic classification, corynephages β and ω are unclassified members of the genus Lambdavirus, family Siphoviridae.

References

Bacteriophages